Naan Kanda Sorgam is a 1960 Indian Tamil-language fantasy comedy film directed and produced by C. Pullayya. The film stars K. A. Thangavelu and Sowcar Janaki. It is a remake of the 1958 Bengali film Jamalaye Jibanta Manush, and was simultaneously filmed in Telugu as Devanthakudu with a largely different cast. The film was released on 12 August 1960 and became a commercial success.

Plot 

Meenakshi is the daughter of Parama Pillai, a miserly millionaire. While she is drawn to public service, her father despises the idea. Meenakshi falls in love with Sundar, a theatre artiste who donates earnings to impoverished people. Parama Pillai despises him but, unknown to him, his daughter assists Sundar in his social welfare activities. When Parama Pillai realises this, he forbids Meenakshi to leave the house and even appoints two men to guard her. Sundar disguises himself as a woman and fools the millionaire into appointing him as Meenakshi's tutor. When Parama Pillai arranges Meenakshi's marriage with a rich but older man, Sundar saves her by helping her escape. Parama Pillai finds his daughter and locks her up, beating Sundar to an inch of his life. The rest of the film deals with how Yama, Vishnu and other gods help Meenakshi and Sundar unite.

Cast 
 K. A. Thangavelu as Sundar
 Sowcar Janaki as Meenakshi
 Alwar Kuppuswamy as Parama Pillai
 M. S. Sundari Bai as Parama Pillai's wife
 S. V. Ranga Rao as Yama
 P. V. Narasimha Bharathi as Narada

Production 
Naan Kanda Sorgam was produced and directed by C. Pullayya  under the banner Bharghavi Films. It was remade from the 1958 Bengali film Jamalaye Jibanta Manush, and simultaneously filmed in Telugu as Devanthakudu with a largely different cast. K. S. Gopalakrishnan wrote the dialogues. Nanjappa, assisted by P.S. Loganathan, handled the cinematography. Shooting for the film took place at Vijaya-Vauhini Studios. The film featured an apsara dance sequence choreographed by Gemini Ramamurthi.

Soundtrack 
G. Aswathama composed the film's music. The lyricists were Thanjai N. Ramaiah Dass, K. S. Gopalakrishnan, Parthiban, and T. K. Sundara Vadhyar. The film had a dance-drama called "Usha Parinayam" for which P. B. Sreenivas and S. Janaki lent their voices.

Release and reception 
Naan Kanda Sorgam was released on 12 August 1960. The Indian Express said, "A hilarious comedy in the best tradition of Tamil genius has been brought to the screen by the plucky Producer-Director C. Pullayya in Nan Kanda Swargam." Kanthan of Kalki lauded Thangavelu's performance, saying it brought the feel of heaven. According to historian Randor Guy, the film was a commercial success "mainly because of the unusual story line and fantasy elements."

References

External links 
 

1960 films
1960s fantasy comedy films
1960s Tamil-language films
Films directed by C. Pullayya
Films scored by Ashwatthama
Films with screenplays by K. S. Gopalakrishnan
Indian fantasy comedy films
Tamil remakes of Bengali films
Yama in popular culture